The enzyme 1,4-dihydroxy-2-naphthoyl-CoA synthase catalyzes the sixth step in the biosynthesis of phylloquinone and menaquinone, the two forms of vitamin K. In E. coli, 1,4-dihydroxy-2-naphthoyl-CoA synthase, formerly known as naphthoate synthase, is encoded by menB and uses O-succinylbenzoyl-CoA as a substrate and converts it to 1,4-dihydroxy-2-naphthoyl-CoA.

Nomenclature 
MenB is part of the crotonase fold super family, named after the crotonase fold in their structure. The systematic name for MenB is 4-(2-carboxyphenyl)-4-oxobutanoyl-CoA dehydratase (cyclizing). Other common names include:
 Naphthoate synthase
 1,4-dihydroxy-2-naphthoate synthase
 Dihydroxynaphthoate synthase
 DHNA-CoA synthase

Reaction 

It was originally thought that the product of this reaction had an oxygen where the SCoA currently resides, however; new research has shown that MenB only catalyzes the above reaction. There is a different enzyme that cleaves the SCoA and attaches the oxygen.

Structure 
MenB is composed of two hexamers in an asymmetric unit, these hexamers are each composed of two trimers in an eclipsed arrangement. Each sub unit of the hexamers has three C terminal alpha helices, and a N terminal spiral core. These sub units come together to form the active site of the enzyme.

The channel formed by alpha helices that can be seen in the middle of the enzyme leads to the active site. This opening exists on both top and bottom of the enzyme, allowing substrates different entry points to the active site, which rests in the middle of the enzyme.

Six different crystal structures have been studied for MenB in Escherichia coli their PDB codes are: 3t88, 3t89, 4els, 4elw, 4elx, and 4i42.

Homologs 
Homologous genes MenB exist in many different organisms, such as; Galium mollugo, Geobacillus kaustophilus, Mycobacterium phlei, Mycobacterium tuberculosis, Spinacia oleracea, and Staphylococcus aureus.

MenB is only found in biosynthesis pathways in plants and bacteria, it does not exist in any other organisms. However, mammals require vitamin K in their diet because it is vital in the blood clotting process.

Cofactors/Inhibitors 
MenB does not require any cofactors to catalyze the reaction.

In the organism Escherichia coli three inhibitors exist: 1-hydroxy-2-naphthoyl-CoA, 2,3-dihydroxybenzoyl-CoA, and 2,4-dihydroxybenzoyl-CoA.

References

 
 

EC 4.1.3
Enzymes of known structure